Sir George St George, knight, of Dunmore (born by 1640 – died December 1713) was an Irish Member of Parliament. He represented Carrick in the Irish House of Commons from September 1703 to his death, sitting alongside his nephew Oliver St George.

He was the younger son of Sir George St George, knight, of Carrickdrumrusk and  Katherine Gifford, brother of Sir Oliver St George, 1st Baronet, and grandson of Sir Richard St George, Clarenceux King of Arms.

He married Elizabeth, daughter of Robert Hannay, 2nd Baronet, and died in October 1711, having had issue:
 Richard, who married Anne Eyre and died without issue in 1726
 George, died unmarried
 Jane, who married St George Ashe, and had issue
 St George Ashe, died in January 1721
 Elizabeth, wife of Ralph Gore, 4th Baronet and eventual sole heiress of her grandfather George St George.
 Catherine, who married Charles Crowe and had issue
 Sackville Crowe, died unmarried
 Elizabeth, wife of William Parsons, 2nd Baronet, died without issue in February 1739
 Lettice
 Emilia, wife of Robert Carleton, died without issue.
His sister Eleanor (died 1713) was the wife of Arthur Gore, 1st Baronet.

References

Swift gives his death date as December 1711 ‘Yes, yes, Sir George St.George dead.’ Journal for Stella, Letter 38, 8 January 1711

1713 deaths
Year of birth uncertain
Irish MPs 1703–1713
17th-century births
Members of the Parliament of Ireland (pre-1801) for County Leitrim constituencies